William Cabell may refer to:

 William Cabell (physician) (1700–1774), notable figure in 18th century Warminster, Virginia
 William Cabell (American Revolution) (1730–1798), Virginia state official during the American Revolution
 William H. Cabell (1772–1853), Governor of Virginia
 William Cabell Rives (1793–1868), statesman from Virginia
 William Cabell Bruce, American politician and writer
 William Lewis Cabell (1827–1911), Confederate general and mayor of Dallas